Caselli is an Italian surname derived from Casello, a diminutive of the personal name Caso. It may refer to:

 Caterina Caselli, Italian record producer, former actress and singer
 Chiara Caselli, Italian Actress
 Cristoforo Caselli, Italian artist, late-15th to early-16th century
 Giovanni Caselli (1815–1891), the inventor of the 'pantelegraph', the forerunner of the modern fax machine
 Hilda Caselli (1836-1901) Swedish educational reformer
 Stefano Caselli, comic book artist

Italian-language surnames